Primera División de México (Mexican First Division) Verano 2000 is a Mexican football tournament - one of two short tournaments that take up the entire year to determine the champion(s) of Mexican football. It began on Saturday, January 15, 2000, and ran until May 8, when the regular season ended. In the final Toluca defeated Santos Laguna and became champions for the sixth time.

Overview

Final standings (groups)

League table

Results

Top goalscorers 
Players sorted first by goals scored, then by last name. Only regular season goals listed.

Source: MedioTiempo

Playoffs

Bracket

Quarterfinals

Toluca won 9–0 on aggregate.

2–2 on aggregate. Guadalajara advanced for being the higher seeded team.

3–3 on aggregate. Santos Laguna advanced for being the higher seeded team.

UNAM won 6–4 on aggregate.

Semifinals

Toluca won 6–3 on aggregate.

Santos won 2–1 on aggregate.

Finals

Toluca won 7–1 on aggregate.

Relegation table

External links
 Mediotiempo.com (where information was obtained)

Mexico
1999–2000 in Mexican football
2000A